Taipingchong Station is a station on Line 4 of Chongqing Rail Transit in Chongqing municipality, China. It is located in Jiangbei District and opened in 2018.

Station structure
There are 2 island platforms at this station, located separately on two floors. The one of Line 4 is on the upper floor, while the other one on the lower floor is reserved for Phase III of Line 18, which is currently under planning.

References

Railway stations in Chongqing
Railway stations in China opened in 2018
Chongqing Rail Transit stations